National Secondary Route 200, or just Route 200 (or ) is a National Road Route of Costa Rica, located in the San José province.

Description
In San José province the route covers Goicoechea canton (Guadalupe district), Moravia canton (San Vicente district).

References

Highways in Costa Rica